Josefa Camejo International Airport , is an airport serving the Paraguaná Peninsula in Venezuela. The airport is named in honor of Josefa Camejo, a heroine of the Venezuelan War of Independence.

On May 22, 2018, Aruba Airlines inaugurated what, according to Travel and Leisure Magazine was the world's shortest international flight. linking the airport with Aruba Airline's hub in Oranjestad, a flight that lasted approximately eight minutes each way.

Facilities
Runway length does not include a  paved overrun on the east end. The Paraguana non-directional beacon (Ident: PRG) and VOR-DME (Ident: PRG) are located on the field.

Airlines and destinations

Accidents and incidents
 On 5 December 2011, a flight from Aruba by the company Tiara Air departing from Josefa Camejo International Airport was on the runway going at full speed to depart when a donkey appeared on the runway.  The aircraft, a Shorts 360, hit the donkey with the right main gear; the pilots kept climbing and continued the flight to Aruba for an emergency landing, which was performed safely with no injury on board.

See also
Transport in Venezuela
List of airports in Venezuela

References

External links
OurAirports - Paraguana
SkyVector - Paraguana
OpenStreetMap - Paraguana

Airports in Venezuela
Buildings and structures in Falcón